Brestovec Orehovički  is a village in Hrvatsko Zagorje region of Croatia. The settlement is administered as a part of Krapina-Zagorje County, Bedekovčina municipality. It is connected by the Ž2162 county road, which in turn connects to the D1 state road.

According to the 2011 census, the village has 334 inhabitants.

Sources

Populated places in Krapina-Zagorje County